Niklas Löwegren is a Swedish orienteering competitor.

He finished 2nd overall in the Orienteering World Cup in 1990, only 3 points behind winner Håvard Tveite. He finished 14th in the World Cup 1988.

In 1989 he won the prestigious Swedish 5-days race O-Ringen.

He competed at the 1991 World Orienteering Championships in Marianske Lazne, where he finished 7th in the short course.

References

Year of birth missing (living people)
Living people
Swedish orienteers
Male orienteers
Foot orienteers